Interleukin 12 receptor is a type I cytokine receptor, binding interleukin 12. It consists of beta 1 and beta 2 subunits.

References

External links
 

Type I cytokine receptors